Bramble Village ( Village in Atfih Center, Giza Governorate, Cairo. According to the 2020 statistics, the total population reached 41,085, of whom 21,015 are men and 20,070 are women. bumblebee Village in Atfih Center, Giza Governorate, Cairo. According to the 2020 statistics, the total population reached 41,085, of whom 21,015 are men and 20,070 are women. bumblebee.

See also 

 Timeline of the 2011 Egyptian revolution since the resignation of Mubarak.

References 

Populated places in Giza Governorate
Cities in ancient Egypt